Teleocichla cinderella is a species of cichlid endemic to Brazil where it is found in the lower Tocantins River basin. This species is a rheophile and has an elongated body shape and underdeveloped swimbladder. The species superficially resembles some species of goby or gudgeon.

References

Cichlinae
Fish of South America
Fish described in 1988
Taxa named by Sven O. Kullander